Aseptis is a genus of moths of the family Noctuidae. The genus was erected by James Halliday McDunnough in 1937.

Species
Aseptis fumeola species group
 Aseptis ethnica (J. B. Smith, 1899)
 Aseptis fanatica Mustelin, 2006
 Aseptis ferruginea Mustelin, 2000
 Aseptis fumeola (Hampson, 1908)
 Aseptis murina Mustelin, 2000
Aseptis lichena species group
 Aseptis lichena (Barnes & McDunnough, 1912)
 Aseptis pseudolichena Mustelin & Leuschner, 2000
unplaced to species group
 Aseptis binotata (Walker, 1865)
 Aseptis catalina (J. B. Smith, 1899)
 Aseptis characta (Grote, 1880)
 Aseptis fumosa (Grote, 1879)
 Aseptis perfumosa (Hampson, 1918)
 Aseptis serrula (Barnes & McDunnough, 1918)
 Aseptis susquesa (J. B. Smith, 1908)
 Aseptis torreyana Mustelin, 2006

Former species
 Aseptis adnixa (Grote, 1880)
 Aseptis bultata (J. B. Smith, 1906)
 Aseptis cara (Barnes & McDunnough, 1918)
 Aseptis dilara (Strecker, 1899)
 Aseptis genetrix (Grote, 1878)
 Aseptis marina (Grote, 1874)
 Aseptis monica (Barnes & McDunnough, 1918)
 Aseptis pausis (J. B. Smith, 1899)
 Aseptis paviae (Strecker, 1874)

References

 
Noctuoidea genera